Horch is a surname. Notable people with the surname include:

 August Horch (1868–1951), German engineer and automobile pioneer
  (born 1948), German politician
 Kyle Horch (born 1964), American classical saxophonist

See also
 Borch